Ernst Buchner may refer to:

 Ernst Büchner (1850–1924), German chemist
 Ernst Buchner (curator) (1892–1962), German arts administrator
 Hans Ernst August Buchner (1850–1902), German bacteriologist